Jalan Batu Arang (Selangor state route B111) is a major road in Selangor, Malaysia.

List of junctions

References

Roads in Selangor